Burwood Plaza is a small 1970s-style two-storey railway shopping centre located in the suburb of Burwood in Sydney's Inner West. Due to the lack in investment into the property by the current owner of Holdmark Property Group and socio-economic changes in the Burwood area, Burwood Plaza has lost such a significant amount of its former shoppers since its prime that despite its small size, has become one of Sydney's most notable dying malls.

By January 2023, the shopping centre had lost most of its main tenants leaving just a Woolworths, Lowes Menswear, a small Subway franchise and almost a quarter of the centre empty. With many of the former notable stores such as the former hair salon, game shop, bakery and convenience store becoming temporary lease stores mainly occupied by stores selling illegal counterfeit goods. This has led to the remains of the shopping centre becoming a hybrid of a dead mall and a black market for Chinese-made counterfeit clothing claiming to be from large brands such as Gucci and Nike.

The shopping centre is also losing foot traffic due to gentrification in the Burwood area. Less people are using the train station and bus stations which Burwood Plaza benefits from being in closer proximity to compared to Westfield, which has is a much more car-suited shopping centre design, compared to the 1970s pedestrian-suited design of Burwood Plaza. The shopping centre also suffers from sharing some of the same shops as Westfield Burwood, this has made the journey to Burwood Plaza from Westfield less common. To revive the centre, Holdmark Property Group has started to position the centre as a community centre for the Burwood area and has attempted to modernise small areas of the centre.

Origins 
The site where Burwood Plaza now lies was once the site of Burwood's first theatre which opened in 1910. It was replaced by the Palatial Theatre which opened in 1921 and featured the first Christie pipe organ in a local theatre. The Palatial closed in 1971 and the space was used by the Royal Blind Society, then as a carpet showroom.

History 

Burwood Plaza opened in 1978 as a competitor to the neighbouring Westfield Burwood shopping centre and was originally anchored by a Waltons department store. The location of the centre was strategic as it was close to Burwood train station, and the centre was designed to be a supplies stop for pedestrians boarding the trains. In the early 1990s a Franklins Big Fresh replaced the anchor tenant space where the Waltons department store was previously located. This would leave Burwood Plaza without a proper department store. Franklins Big Fresh would soon close in 2001 and was replaced with a Woolworths supermarket, which became the new anchor tenant.

The centre has not received any major renovations since its opening in 1978, even before the ownership of Holdmark Property Group. One example of the lack of investment in the property is the outdoor signage, which has not been updated since late 1988, even though the official corporate logo for the centre has been changed multiple times since. The most recent renovation to the exterior of the building is the updated Woolworths supermarket signage following a company-wide rebrand.

On 14 November 2015, a small scale Toys "R" Us store opened a location on the space of the former Best & Less clothing store. Due to company-wide financial issues within Toys "R" Us unrelated to the centre, the Toys "R" Us location closed in August 2018 and the current tenant, Japanese 100-yen shop Daiso soon opened a store on the former location.

Burwood Plaza has been in a rapid decline of shoppers since late 2021 due to lack of significant investment into the building in preparation for the redevelopment and the opening of several stores in the neighbouring Westfield Burwood shopping centre which were similar to previous tenants of Burwood Plaza. This led to tenants removing their presence in the centre, leaving empty tenant spaces. Beginning in 2022, some of the empty tenant spaces were used for COVID-19 vaccination.

Acquisition and redevelopment 

In November 2014, Parramatta-based Holdmark Property Group acquired Burwood Plaza from Centuria Property Funds for a price of around $80 million. With plans for the site to be used to build a commercial complex known as Burwood Place, with a new convenience centered shopping centre. The current centre is expected to close in early 2025. In January 2019, various renders of the development were released to the public, disagreements from the local Burwood community created a small opposition to the redevelopment.

Gallery

References

External links 
  Burwood Plaza official website

Shopping centres in Sydney
Shopping malls established in 1978
1978 establishments in Australia